Mahatma Gandhi University of Medical Sciences & Technology is located in  Jaipur in Rajasthan, India.

References

External links

2011 establishments in Rajasthan
Universities and colleges in Rajasthan
Educational institutions established in 2011